The 22nd BET Awards took place on June 26, 2022. The ceremony celebrates achievements in entertainment and honors music, sports, television, and movies. The ceremony was hosted for the second time by Taraji P. Henson, at the Microsoft Theater in Los Angeles on June 26, 2022.

The nominees were announced on June 1, 2022. Doja Cat received the most nominations with 6, ahead of Drake and Ari Lennox, who received with four nominations each.

American rapper, songwriter and producer Sean Combs, professionally known as Puff Daddy and Diddy, was honored with the BET Lifetime Achievement Award for his "incomparable cultural force and creative visionary whose impact has created historic paradigm shifts across music, media, fashion, and lifestyle".

Performers
The list of performers was announced on June 16, 2022.

Winners and nominees

References 

BET Awards
2022 film awards
2022 awards
2022 awards in the United States
2022 music awards
2022 sports awards
2022 television awards
June 2022 events in the United States